This is a list of neighborhoods in the metropolitan city of Kathmandu, the capital and the largest municipality of Nepal. The 2011 census placed its population at about 975,000. Kathmandu is composed of neighborhoods, which are utilised quite extensively and more familiar among locals. However, administratively the city is divided into 35 wards, numbered from 1 to 35.

List of neighborhoods of Kathmandu:

 Baluwatar
 Baneshwor
 Chabahil
 Dilli Bazaar
 Gairidhara
 Gyaneshwar
 Kalimati
 Lazimpat
 Maru
 Naxal
 Samakhushi
 Sinamangal
 Swayambhu (including major areas around the Stupa)
 Thamel
 Balaju
 Maharajgunj
 Banasthali
 Nayabazar
 Shorakhutte
 Lainchaur
 New Road
 Dallu
 Chhauni
 Kalanki
 Teku
 Tripureshwor
 Kuleshwor
 Asan
 Thapathali
 Maitighar
 Tinkune
 Koteshwor
 Bagbazar
 Anamnagar
 Kamaladi
 Hattisar
 Durbarmarg
 Chandol
 Bansbari
 Dhumbarahi
 Sukedhara
 Boudha
 Gaushala
 Handigaun

References

 

Kathmandu